Victoria Road, currently known as the Chigwell Construction Stadium for sponsorship purposes, is the home ground of Dagenham & Redbridge F.C. of Dagenham, Greater London, England. It has a capacity of 6,078.

Ground use
Although currently, it is used by Dagenham & Redbridge F.C., over the years it has been used to host some very important matches.

This includes games such as a full women's international match of England vs Sweden, one of the 2021–22 Women's FA Cup semi-finals and UEFA Youth International matches involving England, San Marino and Cyprus.

This is also in addition to various regional cup finals.

The Women's Super League team West Ham United F.C. Women, are also using this ground to host their league matches, along with another West Ham side in their Under-23's.

Images

External links
Victoria Road at StadiumDB

References

Football venues in London
Buildings and structures in the London Borough of Barking and Dagenham
Dagenham & Redbridge F.C.
Tourist attractions in the London Borough of Barking and Dagenham
Sports venues completed in 1917
Dagenham
English Football League venues
Dagenham F.C.
Redbridge Forest F.C.
Women's Super League venues